Guelph City Council is the governing body for the city of Guelph, Ontario.

The council consists of the Mayor of Guelph and 12 ward councillors. Each ward elects 2 members to represent them. The council operates in the Guelph City Hall.

Municipal elections are held every four years. The last election took place October 24, 2022.

Wards

Guelph is divided into six wards for the purposes of municipal organization:
 Ward 1 (St Patrick's) comprises the easternmost area of Guelph, bound in the west by Victoria Road.
 Ward 2 (St. George's) is between the Speed River and Victoria Road, and north of the Eramosa River.
 Ward 3 (St John's) is west and north of the Speed River, and east of the Hanlon Expressway; it includes Downtown Guelph.
 Ward 4 (St. David's) comprises the area west of the Hanlon Expressway and north of the Speed River.
 Ward 5 (St. Andrew's) is the area immediately south of the Speed and Eramosa Rivers; this ward includes the University of Guelph and Stone Road Mall.
 Ward 6 (St. James) comprises the southernmost area of Guelph, bound in the north by Stone Road, Kortright Road West, and Arkell Road.

Ward boundaries were updated in 2021 to reflect changes in population distribution and future growth; however, the number of wards and councillors remains the same for the 2022 Ontario municipal elections.

2022-2026 Guelph City Council Members

2018-2022 Guelph City Council Members

2014-2018 Guelph City Council Members

Notes
See List of Guelph municipal elections for previous election results.

References

Municipal councils in Ontario
Municipal government of Guelph